Stanislav Sel'skiy (born 2 September 1991) is a Russian rugby union player who generally plays as a hooker represents Russia internationally.

Career 

In the European Rugby Challenge Cup he has 5 tries in 24 matches for Enisey-STM. Stanislav made his international debut for Russia against Emerging Italy on 8 June 2012.

He featured in a PRL All-Star Game in 2013 and the match was held as part of the celebration of the 90th anniversary of rugby in Russia. He was included in the Russian squad for the 2019 Rugby World Cup which was held in Japan for the first time and also marked his first World Cup appearance.

He was also part of the national side which participated at the 2020 Rugby Europe Championship and 2021 Rugby Europe Championship.

Honours
 Russian Championships (7): 2011, 2012, 2014, 2016, 2017, 2018, 2019
 Russian Cup (3): 2014, 2016, 2017
 Russian Supercup (3): 2014, 2015, 2017
 European Rugby Continental Shield (2): 2016-17, 2017–18

References 

Russian rugby union players
Russia international rugby union players
Living people
1991 births
People from Novokuznetsk
Rugby union hookers
Sportspeople from Kemerovo Oblast